Mircea Vodă may refer to several places in Romania:

 Mircea Vodă, Brăila, a commune in Brăila County
 Mircea Vodă, Constanța, a commune in Constanța County
 Mircea Vodă, a village in Sălcioara Commune, Dâmbovița County
 Mircea Vodă, a village in Cerna Commune, Tulcea County